Kim Seong-han may refer to:
Kim Seong-han (baseball) (born 1958), South Korean baseball player
Seonghan of Silla, Korean royalty
Kim Seong-han (novelist) (1919–2010), South Korean novelist